A dagobert is a sandwich popular in Belgium, consisting of a baguette filled with ham, cheese and raw vegetables. The "Belgicism" dagobert was reported as being included in the Éditions Larousse 2019 edition of its dictionary.

References

Sandwiches
Belgian cuisine